The Abuja International Trade Fair (AITF) is an annual event held in Abuja, Nigeria, organized by the Abuja Chamber of Commerce and Industry.  The fair attracts various stakeholders, including businesses, government agencies, industry experts, investors, and consumers, and serves as a platform for exhibitors to showcase their products and services and network with potential business partners.

History 
The Abuja International Trade Fair was held in 2005 and has since become an annual event. The aim of the fair is to promote economic growth and development in Nigeria and to encourage international trade and investment. The fair also allows local businesses to showcase their products and services to a wider audience and learn from industry experts.

Events 
The Abuja International Trade Fair features a wide range of events, including exhibitions, conferences, workshops, and seminars. The exhibitions showcase various products and services, including agriculture, manufacturing, construction, energy, ICT, and tourism. The conferences, workshops, and seminars cover various topics related to business and industry, including trade policies, investment opportunities, and emerging markets.

See Also 
Lagos International Trade Fair

References 

Annual events in Nigeria
Recurring events established in 2005
Economy of Abuja
Trade fairs in Nigeria
Establishments in Nigeria